Gaius Cornelius Gallus (c. 70 – 26 BC) was a Roman poet, orator and politician.

Birthplace

The identity of Gallus' purported birthplace, Forum Iulii, is still uncertain, and it is based on the epithet "Foroiuliensis" that Jerome gave to him. In Roman times, there were several cities with this name, but a dispute about Gallus' birthplace between Fréjus and the other cities is attested since the Renaissance. During the 20th century, Ronald Syme took into consideration Fréjus and Cividale del Friuli, and called the former the more likely. Jean-Paul Boucher recognized at least five candidates, and considered Forum Iulii Iriensium (modern Voghera) the most suitable.

It has been also suggested that "Foroiuliensis" could refer not to Gallus' birthplace, but rather to the place where he performed a memorable act, namely the erection of the Vatican Obelisk in the Forum Iulium of Alexandria, thus making some generic mentions of Gallia as the sole possible clue about his place of origin.

Career
Born in a humble family, Gallus moved to Rome at an early age where he was taught by the same master as Virgil and Varius Rufus. Virgil, who was in great measure indebted to the influence of Gallus for the restoration of his estate, dedicated one of his eclogues (X) to him. The Erotica Pathemata of Parthenius of Nicaea was also dedicated to Gallus.

In political life Gallus espoused the cause of Octavian and as a reward for his services was made prefect of Egypt (Suetonius, Augustus, 66). In 29 BC, Cornelius Gallus led a campaign to subdue a revolt in Thebes.  He erected a monument in Philae to glorify his accomplishments. Gallus' conduct brought him into disgrace with the emperor and a new prefect was appointed. After his recall, Gallus committed suicide (Cassius Dio, liii 23).

Gallus enjoyed a high reputation among his contemporaries as a man of intellect, and Ovid (Tristia, IV) considered him the first of the elegiac poets of Rome. He wrote four books of elegies chiefly on his mistress Lycoris (a poetical name for Cytheris, a notorious actress), in which he took for his model Euphorion of Chalcis; he also translated some of this author's works into Latin. He is often thought of as a key figure in the establishment of the genre of Latin love-elegy, and an inspiration for Propertius, Tibullus, and Ovid. Almost nothing by him has survived; until recently, one pentameter (uno tellures diuidit amne duas, "[the Scythian river Hypanis] divides two lands with its single stream," quoted in Vibius Sequester's De Fluminibus) was all that had been handed down. Then, in 1978 a papyrus was found at Qasr Ibrim, in Egyptian Nubia, containing nine lines by Gallus, arguably the oldest surviving manuscript of Latin poetry. The fragments of four poems attributed to him, first published by Aldus Manutius in 1590 and printed in Alexander Riese's Anthologia Latina (1869), are generally regarded as a forgery; and Pomponius Gauricus's ascription to him of the elegiac verses of Maximianus is no longer accepted.

The surviving poetry of Gallus 
Scholars used to believe, in the absence of any surviving poetry by Gallus and on the basis of his high reputation among his contemporaries, that his poetical gifts were little short of those of Virgil. The classicist Tenney Frank famously declared in 1922: 'What would we not barter of all the sesquipedalian epics of empire for a few pages of Cornelius Gallus, a thousand for each!' The discoveries at Qasr Ibrim have now given us nine lines of Gallus.  Coincidentally, one of them mentions Lycoris, ('saddened, Lycoris, by your wanton behaviour'), confirming their authorship.

Four lines which probably once stood at the beginning of a poem pay homage to Julius Caesar shortly before his assassination, on the eve of his projected campaign against the Parthians:

Fata mihi, Caesar, tum erunt mea dulcia, quom tu / maxima Romanae pars eris historiae / postque tuum reditum multorum templa deorum / fixa legam spolieis deivitiora tueis.

'I will count myself blessed by fortune, Caesar, when you become the greatest part of Roman history; and when, after your return, I admire the temples of many gods adorned and enriched with your spoils.' 

This obsequious compliment need not be taken seriously. Later Augustan poets tended to distance themselves from the world of high politics and often drew a humorous contrast between the martial ambition of their ruler and their own ignoble love affairs. The next, missing, stanza may have subverted the sense, e.g. 'As it is, while you're off winning renown by conquering Parthia, I'm stuck here in Rome, with nothing to do but make love to Lycoris.'

A second, incomplete, block of four lines appears to be addressed to Lycoris. So long as she likes his verses, Gallus seems to be saying, he can ignore any 'peer reviews' they might attract from critics such as Publius Valerius Cato and Viscus:

. . . tandem fecerunt carmina Musae /quae possim domina deicere digna mea. / . . . atur idem tibi, non ego, Visce / . . . Kato, iudice te vereor.

'At last the Muses have made songs which I can utter worthy of my mistress.

"Gallus or Roman Scenes of the time of Augustus"

Gallus is the central figure in a fictionalised but fact-based account of the private life, manner and customs of the Romans: 'Gallus, or Roman Scenes of the time of Augustus', written by Professor Wilhelm Adolf Becker of Leipzig and published there in 1838.  The work was translated into English by the Rev. Frederick Metcalfe in the 1840s.  The 1898 Longmans, Green & Co. edition is available as a scan at the Internet Archive and is (2021) being prepared as an e-book by Project Gutenberg.  The story of Gallus's fall from Augustus's favour forms the framework for an extensive learned discourse on what life was like in Rome as evidenced in Latin extracts from a number of writers (Suetonius, Martial, Pliny, Ovid, etc.) but most notably quotations in the Ancient Greek from Cassius Dio.  The book contains extensive notes and 'Excurses' on various subjects including: the Roman Family, the Roman House, Books and Letters, Baths and Gymnastics, Dress, Banqueting, Drinking, and the Burial of the Dead.

Ovid, Amor.

Gallus et Hesperiis et Gallus notus Eois; Et sua cum Gallo nota Lycoris erit.

External links
Gallus on the Southern Bug river link here

References

Ancient Roman poets
Roman governors of Egypt
1st-century BC Roman governors of Egypt
70s BC births
26 BC deaths
Year of birth uncertain
Cornelii
1st-century BC Romans
1st-century BC Roman poets